The 2001 World Weightlifting Championships were held in Antalya, Turkey from November 4 to November 11. The men's competition in the lightweight (69 kg) division was staged on 6 November 2001.

Medalists

Records

Results

References
Weightlifting World Championships Seniors Statistics, Page 34 

2001 World Weightlifting Championships